Nérée Arsenault (28 August 1911 – 18 January 1982) was a Canadian politician and forest engineer. In the 1957 federal election, he was elected to the House of Commons of Canada in the riding of Bonaventure representing the Progressive Conservative Party. He did not stand for the next election in 1958.

References

External links
 

1911 births
1982 deaths
Members of the House of Commons of Canada from Quebec
Progressive Conservative Party of Canada MPs